Historical trauma (HT), as used by psychotherapists social workers, historians, and psychologists, refers to the cumulative emotional harm of an individual or generation caused by a traumatic experience or event. Historical Trauma Response (HTR) refers to the manifestation of emotions and actions that stem from this perceived trauma.

According to its advocates, HTR is exhibited in a variety of ways, most prominently through substance abuse, which is used as a vehicle for attempting to numb pain. This model seeks to use this to explain other self-destructive behaviour, such as suicidal thoughts and gestures, depression, anxiety, low self-esteem, anger, violence, and difficulty recognising and expressing emotions. Many historians and scholars believe the manifestations of violence and abuse in certain communities are directly associated with the unresolved grief that accompanies continued trauma.

Historical trauma, and its manifestations, are seen as an example of Transgenerational trauma (though the existence of transgenerational trauma itself is disputed). For example, a pattern of maternal abandonment of a child might be seen across three generations, or the actions of an abusive parent might be seen in continued abuse across generations. These manifestations can also stem from the trauma of events, such as the witnessing of war, genocide, or death. For these populations that have witnessed these mass level traumas (e.g., war, genocide, colonialism), several generations later these populations tend to have higher rates of disease.

Maria Yellow Horse Brave Heart first developed the concept of historical trauma while working with Lakota communities in the 1980s. Since then, many other researchers have developed the concept and applied it to other populations, such as African Americans and Holocaust survivors.

History of research
First used by social worker and mental health expert Maria Yellow Horse Brave Heart in the 1980s, scholarship surrounding historical trauma has expanded to fields outside of the Lakota communities Yellow Horse Brave Heart studied. Yellow Horse Brave Heart's scholarship focused on the ways in which the psychological and emotional traumas of colonisation, relocation, assimilation, and American Indian boarding schools have manifested within generations of the Lakota population. Yellow Horse Brave Heart's article "Wakiksuyapi: Carrying the Historical Trauma of the Lakota," published in 2000, compares the effects and manifestations of historical trauma on Holocaust survivors and Native American peoples. Her scholarship concluded that the manifestations of trauma, although produced by different events and actions, are exhibited in similar ways within each afflicted community.

Other significant original research on the mechanisms and transmission of intergenerational trauma has been done by scholars such as Daniel Schechter, whose work builds on the pioneers in this field such as: Judith Kestenberg, Dori Laub, Selma Fraiberg, Alicia Lieberman, Susan Coates, Charles Zeanah, Karlen Lyons-Ruth, Yael Danieli, Rachel Yehuda and others. Although each scholar focuses on a different population – such as Native Americans, African Americans, or Holocaust Survivors – all have concluded that the mechanism and transmission of intergenerational trauma is abundant within communities that experience traumatic events. Daniel Schechter's work has included the study of experimental interventions that may lead to changes in trauma-associated mental representation and may help in the stopping of intergenerational cycles of violence.

Joy DeGruy's book, Post Traumatic Slave Syndrome, analyzes the manifestation of historical trauma in African-American populations, and its correlation to the lingering effects of slavery. In 2018, Dodging Bullets—Stories from Survivors of Historical Trauma, the first documentary film to chronicle historical trauma in Indian Country, was released. It included interviews with scientist Rachel Yehuda, sociologist Melissa Walls, and Anton Treuer along with first hand testimonies of Dakota, Lakota, Ojibwe and Blackfeet tribal members.

Indigenous historical trauma 
Maria Yellow Horse Brave Heart first coined the term Indigenous Historical Trauma (IHT) in the 1990s, to characterize the psycho-social legacy of European colonization in North American Indigenous communities. The broader concept of Historical Trauma was developed from this, and gained footing in the clinical and health science literatures in the first two decades of the 21st century. In 2019, a team of psychologists at the University of Michigan published a systematic review of the literature so far on the relationship between IHT and adverse health outcomes for Indigenous peoples in the United States and Canada.

An example of Indigenous Historical Trauma is the ”Indian boarding schools” created in the 19th century to acculturate Native Americans to European culture. According to one of their advocates Richard Henry Pratt, the intention of these schools was to literally “kill the indian” in the student, “and save the man”. These schools attempted to strip children of their cultural identity by practices such as cutting off their long hair, or forbidding them to speak their native language. After the school year was over, some indigenous children were hired to work for “non-Indian families” and many did not return home to their families.

The fear and loneliness caused by such schools can be readily imagined. But scientific research has consistently found that the stress caused by Indian boarding schools resulted in depression, sexual abuse, and suicidality. Descendants of boarding school survivors may carry this historical trauma for generations, and in the present day, Native American students still face challenges related to their lack of awareness of “psychological injury or harm from ancestral experiences with colonial violence and oppression”. Indeed, people who are unaware of the traumatic experiences their ancestors endured may find themselves involved in continued patterns of substance abuse, violence, physical abuse, verbal abuse, and suicide attempts. 

Therefore, the term Indigenous Historical Trauma (IHT) can be useful to explain emotions and other psychological phenomena experienced by Native Americans today. Identifying IHT helps with recognizing the “psychological distress and health disparities”  linked to current Indigenous communities.

Manifestation
Historical Trauma (HT), or Historical Trauma Response (HTR), can manifest itself in a variety of psychological ways. However, it is most commonly seen through high rates of substance abuse, alcoholism, depression, anxiety, suicide, domestic violence, and abuse within afflicted communities. The effects and manifestations of trauma are extremely important in understanding the present-day conditions of afflicted populations.

Within Native American communities, high rates of alcoholism and suicide have direct correlation to the violence, mistreatment, and abuses experienced at boarding schools, and the loss of cultural heritage and identity these institutions facilitated. Although many present-day children never experienced these schools first-hand, the "injuries inflicted at Indian boarding schools are continuous and ongoing," affecting generations of Native peoples and communities.

Countries like Australia and Canada have issued formal apologies for their involvement in the creation and implementation of boarding schools that facilitated and perpetuated historical trauma. Australia's Bringing Them Home report and Canada's Truth and Reconciliation Commission (Canada) both detailed the "experiences, impacts, and consequences" of government-sponsored boarding schools on Indigenous communities and children. Both reports also detail the problems facing Indigenous populations today, such as economic and health disparities, and their connection to the historical trauma of colonization, removal, and forced assimilation.

Author and teacher Thomas Hübl, documenting his experiences working with Germans and Israelis to engage in dialogue around their shared historical and intergenerational trauma, writes:Whether we refer to a person as victim or victimizer, oppressor or oppressed, it appears that no one, given time, remains untouched by collective suffering. Historical traumas impart their consequences indiscriminately upon child and family, institution and society, custom and culture, value and belief. Collective traumas distort social narratives, rupture national identities, and hinder the development of institutions, communities, and cultures, just as personally experienced trauma has the power to disrupt the psychological development of a growing child.

Treatment

Treatment of HT must repair the afflicted person or communities' connection with their culture, values, beliefs, and self-image. It takes the forms of individual counseling or therapy, spiritual help, and group or entire community gatherings, which are all important aspects in the foundations of the healing process. Treatment should be aimed at a renewal of destroyed culture, spiritual beliefs, customs, and family connections, and a focus on reaffirming one's self-image and place within a community. Cultural revitalization initiatives for treating historical trauma among Native groups in North America include “culture camps,” where individuals live or camp out on their tribe’s traditional lands in order to learn cultural practices that have been lost to them as a result of colonial practices.

Due to the collective and identity-based nature of HT, treatment approaches should be more than solutions to one individual’s problems. Healing must also entail revitalization of practices and ways of being that are necessary not just for individuals but for the communities they exist within. Relieving personal distress and promoting individual coping are important treatment goals, but successful treatment of HT also depends upon community-wide efforts to ending intergenerational transmission of collective trauma.

Particular attention should be given to the needs and empowerment of peoples who are vulnerable, oppressed, and living in poverty. Social workers and activists should promote social justice and social change with and on behalf of clients, individuals, families, groups, and communities. In order for advocacy to be accurate and helpful to the afflicted populations, social workers should understand the cultural diversity, history, culture, and contemporary realities of clients.

See also
 Collective trauma
 Dispossession, oppression, and depression
 Epigenetics
 Post Traumatic Slave Syndrome
 Psychological trauma
 Transgenerational trauma

References

External links
 Healing Collective Trauma
 Discovering Our Story: Wisdom of the Elders 
 Maria Yellow Horse Brave Heart, Intergenerational Trauma, Youtube

Anxiety disorders
Psychological stress
Trauma types
Adverse childhood experiences